King of Kotha is an upcoming Indian Malayalam-language  action thriller film directed by Abhilash Joshiy in his directorial debut and produced by Wayfarer Films and Zee Studios. The film stars Dulquer Salmaan in the lead role with Gokul Suresh and Aishwarya Lekshmi. The cinematography is handled by Nimish Ravi and the film score is composed by Jakes Bejoy while the songs are composed by Jakes Bejoy and Shaan Rahman separately.

The film was announced in July 2021. Principal photography commenced in September 2022 and wrapped up in February 2023. The film is scheduled to release worldwide in 24 August 2023 during Onam.

Cast

Production

Development 
The film along with its title was announced on 28 July 2021 on the occasion of Dulquer Salmaan's 35th birthday. Salmaan who portrays a gangster in the film stated: "King of Kotha will be having all these elements (perfectly timed clap points, catchy songs, and elevation sequences) that could satisfy the audience." He also added that this is a dream project with his childhood friend Abhilash Joshiy, son of veteran filmmaker Joshiy, and have been waiting for the past few years to find a perfect project to collaborate. It is written by Abhilash N. Chandran, who had earlier worked on Porinju Mariam Jose (2019). In October 2022, Salmaan stated in an interview that, "It is an action gangster genre, noir film set in a fictional town. It’s interesting because I generally tend to veer away from this type of cinema quite a bit. But I found a bit of a balance. I feel like it has content, it has great writing, but it’s also a very commercial gangster drama."

Filming and casting 
The principal photography began on 27 September 2022 at Karaikudi, while additional filming occurred in Rameswaram and Ramanathapuram. Nimish Ravi joined as the film's cinematographer. After rumours of Samantha Ruth Prabhu being approached for a role, it was reported that Aishwarya Lekshmi was signed to play Salmaan's pair. Shabeer Kallarakkal was roped in to play the main antagonist. Actor Gokul Suresh was cast to play a pivotal role and actors Chemban Vinod Jose and Sudhi Koppa were also added to the cast. Nyla Usha and Shanthi Krishna were also cast in key roles. Zee Studios associated with Wayfarer Films for the film's production and marked its maiden feature film production venture in Malayalam. It was reported that, a major schedule in Karaikudi was interrupted due to the rain, and the team took a brief break. Ritika Singh joined the production in early-November 2022 and shot for an item song. In December 2022, Shammi Thilakan announced his addition to the cast through his Facebook page. In January 2023, Prasanna and Saran Shakthi confirmed being cast in the film. Filming took 95 days and the Karaikudi schedule was wrapped up on 21 February 2023.

References

External links
 

Upcoming Indian films
Upcoming Malayalam-language films
2023 films
Films set in Kerala
Films set in Tamil Nadu
Indian action thriller films
Upcoming films
Films shot in Tamil Nadu
2020s Malayalam-language films